The Canadian–American Hockey League, popularly known as the Can-Am League, was a professional ice hockey league that operated from 1926 to 1936. It was a direct predecessor of the American Hockey League.

For its first ten years the Can-Am's membership varied between five and six teams. However, when the Boston Bruin Cubs dropped out after the 1935–36 season, the league was reduced to just four active teams (Philadelphia, Providence, Springfield, and New Haven). At the same time, the Rust Belt-based International Hockey League had also been cut down to just four teams; Syracuse, Buffalo, Pittsburgh, and Cleveland. With both leagues at the bare minimum number of teams to be viable, they decided to form a temporary "circuit of mutual convenience" known as the International-American Hockey League. For the next two years, the two leagues played an interlocking schedule with the Can-Am clubs serving as the IAHL's Eastern Division and the IHL as its Western Division.

At a meeting held in New York City on June 28, 1938, the two leagues formally merged into a unified eight-team circuit operating under the IAHL name with the addition of the EAHL's then three-time defending champion Hershey Bears, which was awarded an IAHL franchise that day to replace the defunct Buffalo club. The league changed its name to the current American Hockey League in 1940.

Two current AHL franchises have roots in the Can-Am. The Hartford Wolf Pack is descended from the Providence Reds franchise, which moved to Binghamton, New York, in 1977 before moving to Hartford in 1997. The Abbotsford Canucks are descended from the Springfield Indians franchise, which moved to Worcester, Massachusetts, in 1994 before relocating to Peoria in 2005, to Utica in 2013, and to Abbotsford, British Columbia, in 2021.

Teams
 Boston Tigers (named Tigers from 1926–1931 and in 1935, Cubs from 1931–1933, Tiger Cubs in 1933–34 and Bruin Cubs from 1934–1936)
 Bronx Tigers (1931–32)
 New Haven Eagles (1926–27 to 1935–36; joins IAHL)
 Newark Bulldogs (1928–29)
 Philadelphia Arrows (1927–28 to 1934–35)
 Philadelphia Ramblers (1935–36; joins IAHL)
 Quebec Castors (Beavers) (1926–27 to 1927–28; 1932–33 to 1934–35)
 Providence Reds (1926–27 to 1935–36; joins IAHL)
 Springfield Indians (1926–27 to 1932–33; 1935–36; joins IAHL)

Champions
The championship trophy was known as the Henri Fontaine Trophy.

References

See also
 List of ice hockey leagues

Canadian-American Hockey League
1926 establishments in Canada
1936 disestablishments in Canada
1926 establishments in the United States
1936 disestablishments in the United States
Sports leagues established in 1926
Sports leagues disestablished in 1936